James McGuire (1911  – November 26, 1974) was a two time president of the United States Soccer Football Association. He played professionally in the American Soccer League and the English Football League. He also earned two schoolboy caps with Scotland and was inducted into the National Soccer Hall of Fame in 1951.

Playing
McGuire was born in Edinburgh, Scotland and raised in Scotland where he played twice for the national team as a schoolboy. At some point, he moved to the United States. In 1929, he signed with the Brooklyn Wanderers of the American Soccer League. In 1931, Celtic toured North America, playing the Wanderers on June 7, 1931. McGuire impressed them enough for them to sign him before returning to Scotland. McGuire never appeared for their first team and in 1932, he moved to Northampton Town of the English Football League. McGuire played with Northampton Town until 1936. According to the National Soccer Hall of Fame, McGuire would return to play in the U.S. during the English off-season. When he left Northampton in 1936, McGuire returned to the U.S. for good, signing with Brooklyn St. Mary's Celtic of the second American Soccer League. In 1938, Brooklyn went to the final of the National Challenge Cup, but lost to Chicago Sparta. The next year, they defeated Chicago Manhattan Beer to win the Challenge Cup title. McGuire retired from playing professionally that summer.

Administration
Following his retirement from playing, McGuire became an administrator. In 1947, he became the president of the American Soccer League. He also served as president of the United States Soccer Football Association (1952–1954 and 1971–1974). In 1974, he was part of the Organizing Committee for the 1974 FIFA World Cup. He died that year, while still president of the USSF.

McGuire was inducted into the National Soccer Hall of Fame in 1951. In 1975, the national U-19 cup was named the McGuire Cup in his honor. He died in Hyde Park, New York.

References

External links
 National Soccer Hall of Fame profile

1911 births
1974 deaths
Scottish footballers
Scottish emigrants to the United States
American soccer players
American Soccer League (1921–1933) players
Brooklyn Wanderers players
American Soccer League (1933–1983) players
Brooklyn St. Mary's Celtic players
Celtic F.C. players
Northampton Town F.C. players
National Soccer Hall of Fame members
Presidents of the United States Soccer Federation
Footballers from Edinburgh
People from New Hyde Park, New York
Association football midfielders
Association football defenders
Scottish expatriate sportspeople in the United States
Expatriate soccer players in the United States
Scottish expatriate footballers